Transgenerational stress inheritance is the transmission of adverse effects of stress-exposure in parents to their offspring through epigenetic mechanisms.

Stress-induced epigenetic changes, particularly to genes that effect the hypothalamic–pituitary–adrenal (HPA) axis, persist into future generations, negatively impacting the capacity of offspring to adapt to stress. Early life experiences, even when generations removed, can cause permanent epigenetic modifications of DNA resulting in changes in gene expression, endocrine function and metabolism.  These heritable epigenetic modifications include DNA methylation of the promoter regions of genes that affect sensitivity to stress.

Mechanism 

Epigenetic modification in response to stress results in molecular and genetic alterations that in turn results in mis-regulated or silenced genes. Heterochromatin is the protein that controls the silencing of these genes epigenetically. For example, epigenetic modifications to the gene BDNF (brain derived neurotrophic factor), as well as dATF-2, as a result of stress can be passed on to offspring. Chronic variable stress induces offspring hypothalamic gene expression modifications, including elevated methylation levels of the BDNF promoter in the hippocampus. This methylation will also occur in the heterochromatin, causing a disrupted heterochromatin to be passed on to the child. Maternal separation and postnatal maternal abuse also increases DNA methylation at regulatory regions of BDNF genes in the prefrontal cortex and hippocampus, leading to potential stress vulnerability in future generations.

Stress can also result in inheritable changes DNA methylation in the promoter regions of the estrogen receptor alpha (ERα), glucocorticoid receptor (GR), and mineralocorticoid receptor (MR).  These changes lead to altered expression of these genes in offspring that in turn leads to decreased stress tolerance.

Stress and the HPA axis

Gene regulation as it relates to the HPA axis has been implicated in transgenerational stress effects. Environmental prenatal stress exposure, for example, alters glucocorticoid receptor gene expression, gene function, and future stress response in F1 and F2 generations. Maternal care  likewise contributes to HPA-related epigenetic modifications. Epigenetic re-programming of gene expression alters stress response in offspring later in life when exposed to decreased maternal care. Inattentive mothering has led to increased levels of gene methyl marks, compared to attentive mothers. Female offspring with low licking-grooming mothers have decreased promoter methylation and increased histone acetylation, leading to increased glucocorticoid receptor expression. Epigenetic modifications as a result of absent maternal care lead to decreased estrogen receptor alpha expression, due to increased methylation at the gene's promoter.

Animal studies

Paternal stress inheritance 

As rodent offspring are fostered mono-parentally and have no direct exposure with their fathers, offspring born of stressed male rodents provide a good model for transgenerational stress inheritance. Direct injection of sperm RNAs to wild type oocytes results in reproducible stress-related modifications.  Small non-coding RNAs may serve as a potential mechanism for stress-related genetic changes in offspring. Mouse models of traumatic early life stress exposure result in microRNA modifications and subsequent differences in gene expression and metabolic function. This effect was reproducible by sperm RNA injection, leading to similar gene modifications in future generations. The novelty of this research suggests direct mechanisms capable of altering epigenetics by stress-related factors.

Phenotypic effects 

Early life experiences and environmental factors may lead to epigenetic modification at specific gene loci, leading to altered neuronal plasticity, function, and subsequent behavior. Chromatin remodeling in rodent offspring and altered gene expression within the limbic brain regions that may contribute to depression, stress, and anxiety-related disorders in future generations. Variations in maternal care, such as maternal licking and grooming, indicates reduced HPA axis reactivity in subsequent generations. Such HPA axis modifications lead to decreased anxiety-like behavior in adulthood and increased glucocorticoid receptor levels leading to negative feedback on HPA reactivity and further behavioral modifications. Rodent models of maternal separation also reveal increased depressive-like behavior in offspring, decreased stress coping abilities, and changes in DNA methylation.

Stress inheritance in humans 

Human models illustrating transgenerational stress effects are limited due to relatively novel exploration of the topic of epigenetics as well as lengthy follow-up intervals required for multi-generational studies. Several models, however, have investigated the role of epigenetic inheritance and transgenerational stress effects. Transgenerational stress in humans, as in animal models, induces effects influencing social behavior, reproductive success, cognitive ability, and stress response. Similar to animal models, human studies have investigated the role of epigenetics and transgenerational inheritance molecularly as it relates to the HPA system. Prenatal influences, such as emotional stress, nutrition depravation, toxin exposure, hypoxia, increased maternal HPA activity, and cortisol levels may activate or affect HPA axis activity of offspring, despite placental barrier.

Biological vulnerability and HPA axis alterations may be observed after maternal epigenetic programing during pregnancy, leading to similar modifications in future generations. Child abuse exposure, for example, is associated with lower baseline infant cortisol levels as well as modified HPA axis function. Human studies investigating posttraumatic stress disorder (PTSD) and its effects on offspring have illustrated similar molecular and HPA axis modification and function. PTSD patients who experienced trauma from genocides or terrorist attacks frequently exhibited aggressive or neglectful behavior toward offspring during critical developmental periods, possibly contributing to permanent glucocorticoid deregulation in offspring. PTSD mothers and children illustrate lower basal cortisol levels and glucocorticoid receptors and increased mineralocorticoid receptors when exposed to stress. Therefore, developmental experiences, such as stress exposure, may have critical effects on neuromodulatory mechanisms transgenerationally.

Strong relationships between maternal care and subsequent epigenetic modification in offspring, similar to that found in animal models, has been observed in humans. Severe emotional trauma in the mother, for example, often leads to modified methylation patterns of DNA in subsequent offspring generations. PTSD exposed offspring illustrate epigenetic modifications similar to that seen in PTSD mothers, with an increased NR3C2 methylation in exon 1 and increased CpG methylation in the NR3C2 coding sequence, leading to alterations in mineralocorticoid receptor gene expression. Additionally, investigation of post mortem hippocampal tissue indicates decreased levels of neuron-specific glucocorticoid receptor mRNA and decreased DNA methylation in promoter regions among suicidal individuals with lifelong stress and/or abuse exposure.

Epigenetic mechanisms as a result of early life stress may be responsible for neuronal and synaptic alterations in the brain. Developmental stress exposure has been shown to alter brain structure and behavioral functions in adulthood. Evidence of decreased complexity in the CA1 and CA3 region of the hippocampus in terms of dendritic length and spine density after early-life stress exposure indicates transgenerational stress inheritance. Therefore, environmental and experience-dependent synaptic reorganization and structure modifications may lead to increased stress vulnerability and brain dysfunction in future generations.

See also 
 Epigenetics of anxiety and stress–related disorders
 Transgenerational trauma

References

Further reading
 

Epigenetics